Three-Pawn Sacrifice Rapid Attack (三歩突き捨て急戦 san-fu tsukisute kyuusen) is a fast attacking strategy in shogi. It's a Static Rook Boat Rapid Attack strategy against Black's (sente) blocking the bishop's diagonal in a Third File Rook. It was created by Hifumi Katō.

Overview

In this fast attack strategy the aimed move becomes evident when, in the accompanying diagram, following gote's P-94, sente defends with P-96. From P-96, it follows ...S-62-53, G-47 (although P-36 might be better if gote was aiming for a fast attack with P-45), and then, three sacrifice pushes of pawns with P-86, Px86 (since Bx86, will be followed by Bx66, S-77, B-2b, and gote is better), P-95, Px95, and, P-75, Px75 (Diagram 2), which, if taken by sente will leave gote in a better position following Lx95, Lx95, P*76, B-99, Rx86. After that, R-88, Rx88+, Bx88, R*87 is a possibility.

See also

 Static Rook

Notes

References

Bibliography

 

Shogi openings
Static Rook openings
Static Rook vs Ranging Rook openings